APWA as an acronym may refer to:

 All Pakistan Women's Association
 American Public Works Association